Suger's Eagle (Aigle de Suger) is an ancient Egyptian porphyry vase mounted in a medieval silver-gilt eagle. It is now displayed along with the French regalia in the Galerie d'Apollon at the Louvre.

The vase likely dates to the second century AD. According to Suger, abbot of Saint-Denis, in his  De administratione, he found, "lying idly in a chest for many years, an Egyptian porphyry vase admirably shaped and polished." In his own words, he determined to adapt and transfer (adaptavimus ... transferre) it into a liturgical vessel "in the form of an eagle" (in aquilae formam), a symbol of Christ. Suger's Eagle is a typical case of the "careful preservation of the ancient relic in a setting which leaves it completely intact." On the bottom of the eagle is a nielloed titulus: "This stone deserves to have mounts of gold and gems. / It was marble. Its settings are more precious than marble." Inscribed around the base of the neck, above the lip of the vessel, is a dedication to the church of Saint-Denis. The goldwork of the neck demonstrates superb chiselwork.

Two large engravings from 1706 depict the treasury of Saint-Denis (including the eagle vase) as it was then displayed, in a cabinet. Its popularity as a tourist attraction prevented the treasure's total destruction during the French Revolution. The eagle and three of Suger's other liturgical vessels—Queen Eleanor's vase and King Roger's decanter, both of rock crystal, and a sardonyx ewer—ended up in the Galerie d'Apollon at the Louvre.

Notes

Sources

External links

Porphyry vase, known as Suger's eagle, at the Louvre

Gothic art